Vinay Rana, (born 16 December 1986) professionally known as Vin Rana is an Indian actor and model. He is known for his roles such as Nakula, one of the five pandavas in Mahabharat and Purab Khanna in Kumkum Bhagya.

Early life
Rana was born on 16 December 1984 in Delhi.

Personal life 
He embraced fatherhood with the birth of his child, Milana Ulianova Rana with his ex-gf Valeria Ulianova. Rana married Nita Sofiani, an Indonesian model in February 2016 but the later separated in 2020 for unknown reasons.

Career

Vin Rana began his television journey in September 2013 by bagging the role of Nakul, one of the five Pandavas in the Star Plus series Mahabharat, based on the sanskrit epic of the same name until it went off air in 2014. He then acted in television series Ek Hasina Thi with the same channel as Karan Seth. Next, he played the role of Malay Mittal in Vishkanya Ek Anokhi Prem Kahani opposite Aishwarya Khare from 2015 to 2016.

Vin Rana has also played pivotal role of Purab Khanna replacing Arjit Taneja in Zee TV's Kumkum Bhagya. A year later, he appeared in the show's spin-off Kundali Bhagya playing the same role with his co-stars Sriti Jha, Shabir Ahluwalia .

In 2019, he was seen essaying the role of Kapil Salgaonkar in Kavach 2: Mahashivratri opposite Deepika Singh, also his music video 'Fitte Muh' was launched in the same year. 

Later, Vin played roles of Oscar Mathews and Abeer Singh in ZEE5's Poison 2 and Jamai 2.0 respectively.

Filmography

Television

Web series

Indonesian shows 
He worked in Indonesia in late 2014 and 2015 and appeared in several shows, including:
 Pesbukers
 The New Eat Bulaga Indonesia
 Aladin & Alakadam

Awards and nominations

References

External links

 

Indian male models
People from Delhi
Indian male television actors
Living people
1986 births
Actors from Mumbai